The following highways are numbered 265:

Canada
 Manitoba Provincial Road 265
 New Brunswick Route 265 
 Prince Edward Island Route 265
 Quebec Route 265
 Saskatchewan Highway 265

Japan
 Japan National Route 265

United States
 Interstate 265
 Alabama State Route 265
 Arkansas Highway 265
 Arkansas Highway 265 Spur
 California State Route 265
 Colorado State Highway 265
 Florida State Road 265 
 Georgia State Route 265 (former)
 Indiana State Road 265
 Maryland Route 265
 Missouri Route 265
 Nevada State Route 265
 New Mexico State Road 265
 New York State Route 265
 Ohio State Route 265
 South Carolina Highway 265
 Tennessee State Route 265
 Texas State Highway 265 (former)
 Texas State Highway Loop 265
 Farm to Market Road 265 (Texas)
 Utah State Route 265